Seishinkai (聖心会) is an international organization for the promotion and teaching of Shitō-ryū Karate. It is now also considered a sub-style of Shitō-ryū.

History

Origin
Seishinkai started as a dojo called Seishin-Kan, founded by Kokuba Kosei on June 6, 1943 in Osaka, Japan. The name Seishi-Kan comes partly from the Kanji for the temple located at the end of the street where Sensei Kokuba lived, Shotennoji. The character Sho can be pronounced sho or sei and means "pure." He believed that true Karate-dō comes from the heart so he called his dojo Seishin or "pure heart" dojo.

World War II
During World War II, many of the Okinawan Karateka who left their homeland came to Osaka and visited the home of their old friend, Kokuba Sensei. In return for room and board these men often taught at the Seishin-Kan dojo and gave private lessons to Kokuba Sensei's young son, Kosho. The Seishin-Kan dojo became a well-known meeting place for budō men in Osaka and many of the founders of Karate taught there.

Post-war
Kokuba Kosei was a devoted student of Motobu Chōki, and upon Motobu's death in 1947 he became the second Sōke of Motobu's branch of karate, known as-ryū-kyu Motobu-ha Karate-dō, and Seishin-kan became the center of the new organisation, Seishin-kai, promoting this style.

In 1959, after the death of Kokuba Kosei, his only son Kuniba Shōgō (Kosho) became the third Sōke of Motobu-ha Karate-do, and the 1st Sōke of Motobu-ha Shitō-ryū Karate-do, a new style that he created by blending Motobu's karate with Shitō-ryū, which he learned from Kenwa Mabuni himself, and other styles that he was taught by the great masters who visited Seishin-kan. Since he was only 29 years old, Teruo Hayashi was appointed as technical advisor and president of Seishin-kai from 1959 until 1970.

In 1983 Sōke Kuniba left Japan and moved the center of operation for Motobu-ha Shitō-ryū Karate-do to Portsmouth VA, and after his death in 1992, Kunio Tatsuno emerged as the Kaicho of Seishinkai. Kuniba's dojo in the U.S. separated from Seishinkai and became independent.

Dissolution and replacement
Kunio Tatsuno died suddenly in May, 1999, and Seishinkai soon dissolved as an organization in Japan. In the same year the sons of Shogo Kuniba, Kosuke Kuniba and Kozo Kuniba, formed Nihon Karate-do Kuniba-kai, which is currently recognized by Japan Karate-do Federation (JKF) as the home of Motobu-ha Shito-ryu.

The free-standing organization called International Seishinkai Karate Union (ISKU) was formed in 1999, now led by Sadatomo Harada, one of the students of Kenwa Mabuni, who is recognized by ISKU as the fifth and current soke of Seishinkai.

References

External links
 International Seishinkai Karate Union
 Kuniba Kai International

Shitō-ryū